Sparta High School may refer to:

Sparta High School (Illinois) in Sparta, Illinois
Sparta High School (Michigan) in Sparta, Michigan
Sparta High School (Missouri) in Sparta, Missouri
Sparta High School (New Jersey) in Sparta, New Jersey
Sparta High School (Wisconsin) in Sparta, Wisconsin

Schools with similar names include:
High Point Charter School in Sparta, Wisconsin